Mimetanthe is a genus of flowering plants in the family Phrymaceae. It has only one species, Mimetanthe pilosa, synonym Mimulus pilosus, known by the common names false monkeyflower  and downy mimetanthe. It is native to the western United States (Arizona, California, Idaho, Nevada, Oregon, Utah and Washington State) and Baja California, where it grows in moist and disturbed habitat types. This plant is different enough from other monkeyflowers that it is treated in its own monotypic genus, Mimetanthe, or it may be retained in Mimulus.

It is an annual herb growing to a maximum height of about 35 centimeters. It is coated densely in long hairs. The oppositely arranged, narrow or wide lance-shaped leaves 1 to 3 centimeters long. The tubular base of the flower is encapsulated in a calyx of sepals. The yellow flower corolla is under a centimeter long, divided into five rounded lobes at the mouth, and often dotted with red in the throat.

References

External links
Jepson Manual Treatment of Mimetanthe pilosus
USDA Plants Profile for Mimulus pilosus
Mimulus pilosus — UC Photos gallery

Flora of California
Flora of Arizona
Flora of Idaho
Flora of Nevada
Flora of Oregon
Flora of Utah
Flora of the California desert regions
Flora of the Cascade Range
Flora of the Klamath Mountains
Flora of the Sierra Nevada (United States)
Flora of the Great Basin
Natural history of the California chaparral and woodlands
Natural history of the California Coast Ranges
Natural history of the Peninsular Ranges
Natural history of the San Francisco Bay Area
Natural history of the Santa Monica Mountains
Natural history of the Transverse Ranges
Phrymaceae
Flora without expected TNC conservation status